Ponte Regina Margherita (Italian for Queen Margherita Bridge), also known as Ponte Margherita, is a bridge linking Piazza della Libertà to Lungotevere Arnaldo da Brescia, in the rioni Campo Marzio and Prati in Rome, Italy.

Description 
The bridge was designed by architect Angelo Vescovali and built between 1886 and 1891; it was dedicated to Margherita of Savoy, first Queen of Italy (1861–1946). The bridge serves as a direct connection between rione Prati and Piazza del Popolo; it was the first masonry bridge built over the Tiber in many centuries.

It shows three masonry arches tiled with travertine and is about 110 meters long.

Notes

Bibliography 

Margherita
Rome R. IV Campo Marzio
Rome R. XXII Prati
Bridges completed in 1891
Road bridges in Italy